was an Empress consort of Japan. She was the consort of Emperor En'yū of Japan.

She was the daughter of regent Fujiwara no Yoritada.  She was placed in the harem of the Emperor to benefit her father in his rivalry with his cousin Fujiwara no Kaneie, who also placed his daughter Fujiwara no Senshi for the same reason, that she would give birth to a Crown Prince and became Empress: Fujiwara no Junshi did become Empress, but it was  Fujiwara no Senshi who gave birth to a Crown Prince, while Junshi had no children.

She ordained as a Buddhist nun in 997.

Notes

Fujiwara clan
Japanese empresses
Japanese Buddhist nuns
10th-century Buddhist nuns
11th-century Buddhist nuns
957 births
1017 deaths